Five ships of the United States Navy have been named USS Kearsarge. The first was named for Mount Kearsarge, and the later ones were named in honor of the first. 

  was a sloop of war launched 11 September 1861, fought in the American Civil War, defeated the Confederate commerce raider , and was wrecked off Central America 2 February 1894.
  was a  launched 24 March 1898, sailed with the Great White Fleet, participated in World War I, was converted to a heavy-crane ship in 1920 and renamed Crane Ship No. 1 (AB-1), then sold for scrapping 9 August 1955.
  was an  renamed Hornet prior to launch, was in commission 1942–1970, and is preserved as a museum ship in Alameda, California.
  was a long-hulled Essex-class aircraft carrier, launched 5 May 1945, served in the Korean War and Vietnam War then scrapped in 1974.
  is a  commissioned in 1993 and remains .

United States Navy ship names